Thomas Moses Foote (August 9, 1808 – February 20, 1858) was an American diplomat and newspaper editor.

Biography

Early life
Thomas Moses Foote was born on August 9, 1808. He graduated from Hamilton College in 1825. He went on to study medicine at the College of Physicians and Surgeons in Fairfield, New York.

Career
He practised medicine. Later, he switched his career to journalism. He was editor of the Albany State Register and the Buffalo Commercial Advertiser.

From January 5 to October 15, 1850, he served as U.S. Chargé to New Granada.
Appointed by President Millard Fillmore on September 16, 1852, he served as U.S. Chargé to the Austrian Empire from December 14, 1852, to June 25, 1853.

Personal life
He was married Aug. 10, 1836 to Margaret St. John of Buffalo. On July 27, 1849, while packing for their journey to Bogota, Margaret contracted cholera and died. On 18 June 1851, he married Julia Allen Wilkeson, daughter of General Ethan B. Allen, widow of Eli R. Wilkeson (son of Judge Samuel Wilkeson, who had also married one of the St. John daughters).  During the stay in Vienna, Julia entered the final stages of tuberculosis. The day after their return to New York City on the Baltic Collins Line steamship Baltic, his wife died at the age of 33, reportedly having been in feeble health for some time. In 1857, he married a third time, to Maria Bird, daughter of Col. William A. Bird, but he died shortly after this marriage.  He had two children by Margaret St. John.

Death
He died in Buffalo on February 20, 1858, after an illness of five days.

References 

1808 births
1858 deaths
Ambassadors of the United States to Austria
Ambassadors of the United States to Colombia
19th-century American newspaper editors
19th-century American diplomats
American male journalists
19th-century American male writers